Gunnel Jonäng (1921–2008) was a Swedish politician. She was a member of the Centre Party. Jonäng was a member of parliament's second chamber, 1969–1988, elected in Gävleborg County constituency. During the 1990s Jonäng was President of the Swedish Pensioners' Association. She was married to Bernt-Olof Jonäng.

References
This article was initially translated from the Swedish Wikipedia article.

Members of the Riksdag from the Centre Party (Sweden)
1921 births
2008 deaths
Members of the Första kammaren
20th-century Swedish politicians